Arvid Knöppel (25 April 1892 – 21 June 1970) was a Swedish sculptor. His work was part of the sculpture event in the art competition at the 1932 Summer Olympics.

References

1892 births
1970 deaths
20th-century Swedish sculptors
Swedish male sculptors
Olympic competitors in art competitions
People from Luleå